Pimelea ligustrina is a species of flowering plant in the family Thymelaeaceae, and is endemic to south-eastern Australia. It is a shrub with lance-shaped or narrowly elliptic leaves arranged in opposite pairs, and clusters of creamy-white, white or pinkish flowers usually surrounded by 4 or 8, greenish to reddish brown involucral bracts.

Description
Flowering time varies with subspecies.

Taxonomy
Pimelea ligustrina was first formally described in 1805 by French naturalist Jacques Labillardière in his Novae Hollandiae Plantarum Specimen.

In 1983, S. Threlfall described three subspecies of P. ligustrina in the journal Brunonia and the names are accepted by the Australian Plant Census:
Pimelea ligustrina subsp. hypericina (A.Cunn.)

Distribution and habitat
This pimelea occurs in the A.C.T. and all states of Australia, except Western Australia.
Subspecies hypericina grows on the margins of wet forest and rainforest, mainly between the Gibraltar Range and Mount Cambewarra in New South Wales. Subspecies ligustrina is widely distributed in forest below  in south-east Queensland, eastern New South Wales, the A.C.T., southern Victoria, the far south-east of South Australia, and in Tasmania.

Ecology
This pimelea is a food plant for caterpillars of the yellow-spot blue butterfly.

Conservation status
Subspecies ciliata is listed as "endangered" under the Victorian Government Flora and Fauna Guarantee Act 1988.

References

ligustrina
Flora of the Australian Capital Territory
Flora of New South Wales
Flora of Queensland
Flora of South Australia
Flora of Tasmania
Flora of Victoria (Australia)
Malvales of Australia
Plants described in 1805
Taxa named by Jacques Labillardière